Frank McGinn may refer to:
 Frank McGinn (baseball)
 Frank McGinn (footballer)